The Men's 4 × 10 kilometre relay competition at the FIS Nordic World Ski Championships 2023 was held on 3 March 2023.

Results
The race was started at 12:29.

References

Men's 4 × 10 kilometre relay